The Farther Adventures of Robinson Crusoe (now more commonly rendered as The Further Adventures of Robinson Crusoe) is a novel by Daniel Defoe, first published in 1719. Just as in its significantly more popular predecessor, Robinson Crusoe (1719), the first edition credits the work's fictional protagonist Robinson Crusoe as its author. It was published under the considerably longer original title: The Farther Adventures of Robinson Crusoe; Being the Second and Last Part of His Life, And of the Strange Surprising Accounts of his Travels Round three Parts of the Globe. Although intended to be the last Crusoe tale, the novel is followed by a non-fiction book involving Crusoe by Defoe entitled Serious Reflections During the Life and Surprising Adventures of Robinson Crusoe: With his Vision of the Angelick World (1720).

The story is speculated to be partially based on Moscow embassy secretary Adam Brand's journal detailing the embassy's journey from Moscow to Peking from 1693 to 1695.

Plot summary
The book starts with the statement about Crusoe's marriage in England. He bought a little farm in Bedford and had three children: two sons and one daughter. Our hero suffered a distemper and a desire to see "his island." He could talk of nothing else, and one can imagine that no one took his stories seriously, except his wife. She told him, in tears, "I will go with you, but I won't leave you." But in the middle of this felicity, Providence unhinged him at once, with the loss of his wife.

Crusoe's return to his island
At the beginning of 1693, Crusoe made his nephew the commander of a ship. Around the beginning of January 1694, Crusoe and Friday went on board this ship in the Downs on the 8th, then arrived at Crusoe's Island via Ireland. They discovered that the English mutineers left on the island by Crusoe a decade earlier had been making trouble. But when the island fell under attack by cannibals, the various parties on the island were forced to work together under truce to meet the threat. Crusoe takes various steps to consolidate leadership on the island and assure the civility of the inhabitants, including leaving a quantity of needed supplies, setting up a sort of rule of law under an honour system and ensuring cohabitating couples are married. He also leaves additional residents with necessary skills. On the way to the mainland once again from Crusoe's island, the ship is attacked by the cannibals. Friday dies from three arrow shots during an attempt to negotiate, but the crew eventually wins the encounter without further serious casualty.

Crusoe's adventures in Madagascar
After having buried Friday in the ocean, the same evening they set sail for Brazil. They stayed for a long period there, then went directly over to the Cape of Good Hope. They landed on Madagascar where their nine men were pursued by three hundred natives, because one of his mariners had carried off a young native girl among the trees. The natives hanged this person, so the crew massacred 32 persons and burned the houses of the native town. Crusoe opposed all these, therefore he was marooned, and settled at the Bay of Bengal for a long time.

Crusoe's travels in Southeast Asia and China
Finally, he bought a ship that later turned out to be stolen. Therefore, they went to the river of Cambodia and Cochinchina or the Bay of Tonquin, until they came to the latitude of 22 degrees and 30 minutes, and anchored at the island of Formosa (Taiwan). Then they arrived on the coast of China. They visited Nanking near the river of Kilam, and sailed southwards to a port called Quinchang. An old Portuguese pilot suggested that they go to Ningpo by the mouth of a river. This Ningpo was a canal that passed through the heart of that vast empire of China, crossed all the rivers and some hills by the help of sluices and gates, and went up to Peking, being near 270 leagues long. So they did, then it was the beginning of February, in the Old Style calendar, when they set out from Peking.

Then they travelled through the following places: Changu, Naum (or Naun, a fortified city), Argun(a) on the Chinese-Russian border (13 April 1703).

Crusoe's travels in Siberia
Argun was the first town on the Russian border; then they went through Nertzinskoi (Nerchinsk), Plotbus, touched a lake called Schaks Ozer, Jerawena, the river Udda, Yeniseysk, and Tobolsk (from September 1703 to beginning of June 1704). They arrived in Europe around the source of the river Wirtska, south of the river Petrou, in a village called Kermazinskoy near Soloy Kamskoy (Solikamsk). They passed a little river called Kirtza, near Ozomoys (or Gzomoys), came to Veuslima (?) on the river Witzogda (Vychegda), running into the Dwina, then they stayed in Lawrenskoy (3–7 July 1704; possibly Yarensk, known as Yerenskoy Gorodok at that time). Finally Crusoe arrived at the White Sea port town Arch-Angel (Archangelsk) on 18 August, sailed into Hamburg (18 September), and The Hague. He arrived at London on 10 January 1705, having been gone from England ten years and nine months.

References

External links 
 
 
 

Robinson Crusoe
1719 novels
Novels by Daniel Defoe
English adventure novels
English historical novels
Novels about pirates
Sequel novels
Novels about cannibalism
18th-century British novels